"Happiness" is a song by Australian singer-songwriter, music producer, and former child actor Sam Sparro. The song was released on 17 February 2012 as the lead single from his second studio album Return to Paradise (2012). The single was certified platinum by the Belgian Entertainment Association.

The song hit number one in the Belgian charts. The Magician Remix (by Belgian DJ Stephen Fasano) is the version that is most popular in Belgium (and the one that made the hit list).

Music video
A music video to accompany the release of "Happiness" was first released onto YouTube on 8 March 2012 at a total length of three minutes and seven seconds.

Live performances
On 2 March 2012 Sam performed the song live Australian breakfast television program Sunrise. He also performed the song on Australian television variety program Young Talent Time.

Track listings

Personnel
Credits adapted from the liner notes of Return to Paradise.

 John Fields – mixing
 Jesse Rogg – writing, mixing, production
 Sam Sparro – vocals, writing, co-production, additional synths
 Dave Wilder – bass
 Charlie Willcocks – writing, piano, synths

Chart performance

Certifications

Release history

References

2012 singles
Sam Sparro songs
2012 songs
EMI Records singles
Songs written by Sam Sparro
Songs written by Jesse Rogg